Hyakka Ryōran: Samurai Girls is a 2010 anime television series based on the light novels written by Akira Suzuki and illustrated by Niθ, published by Hobby Japan. Produced by ARMS, the series is directed by KOBUN; series composition by Ryunosuke Kingetsu; music by Tatsuya Kato; produced by Hisato Usui, Ryūji Sekine, Shinsaku Tanaka, and Takuro Hatakeyama; character designs by Tsutomu Miyazawa; with narration in early episodes provided by Fumihiko Tachiki. The series takes place in Great Japan, an alternate version of Japan where the Tokugawa shogunate remained active and has remained isolated from the rest of the world, and the story centers on Muneakira Yagyu, a young man attending Buou Academic School, an academy located at the base of Mount Fuji where elite nobles train to become samurai warriors. His life takes a sudden turn when he meets Jubei Yagyu, a mysterious girl who fell from the sky naked who later becomes his first "Master Samurai" after receiving a kiss from her.

Twelve episodes aired on Chiba TV and TV Kanagawa between October 4 and December 20, 2010, with later broadcasts on TV Saitama, Tokyo MX, TV Aichi, Sun Television, and AT-X. A preview of the first episode aired on Tokyo MX on September 4, 2010 prior to the official airing. Simulcasts were provided in North America by Anime Network on their video portal for their paid subscribers, and in Australia and New Zealand by Madman Entertainment. Six DVD and Blu-ray volumes were released by Media Factory between November 25, 2010 and April 28, 2011, each containing an OVA short called  and a voiced 4-koma illustrated by Chiruo Kazahana. A Blu-ray box set is scheduled for release on February 27, 2013.

Samurai Girls is licensed in North America by Sentai Filmworks, and distributor Section23 Films released the series with an English dub (produced by Seraphim Digital) on August 23, 2011 on DVD and Blu-ray. The anime is licensed in Australia and New Zealand by Madman Entertainment, and in the United Kingdom by Manga Entertainment. The English dub of the anime premiered on Anime Network's video portal on June 23, 2011.

A second anime season, titled , was announced on the twelfth volume of the light novels. The second season is directed by KOBU; series composed by Satoru Nishizono; music by Tatsuya Kato; produced by Makoto Ito, Osamu Koshinaka, Ryūji Sekine, and Takuro Hatakeyama; and character designs by Tsutomu Miyazawa. Twelve episodes aired on AT-X from April 5 to June 21, 2013 with later broadcasts on Tokyo MX, TV Aichi, BS11, Chiba TV, and Sun Television.

Series overview

Episode list

Season 1 (2010)

Season 2 (2013)

OVAs

DVD/Blu-ray Specials

References

External links
Official anime website
Samurai Girls at Madman Entertainment

Hyakka Ryōran Samurai Girls